Coleophora strutiella is a moth of the family Coleophoridae. It is found in Spain.

The larvae feed on Gypsophila struthium. They create a trivalved, light yellow brown, tubular silken case of 6.5–8 mm. The mouth angle is 35°. Full-grown cases are found at the end of May and early June.

References

strutiella
Moths of Europe
Moths described in 1975